Jon Hallvardson Smør (fl. 1375) was a Norwegian nobleman. He was a son of the knight Hallvard Jonson Smør. In 1375, Jon was the ombudsman of king Haakon VI of Norway. He had two known children, the son Svale, and daughter Ulvhild (whose granddaughter Birgitte married Trond Tordson Benkestok).

See also
 Smør
 Norwegian nobility

References
Handegård, Odd (2008), "Vår felles slektshistorie. Hardanger, Sunnhordland og Ryfylke m.m. 1170-1650", p. 109

Norwegian knights
14th-century Norwegian nobility
J